This is a list of Margate F.C. managers since the club appointed its first full-time manager in 1929, along with the number of competitive games managed and winning percentage where available.

Managerial history
Although Margate F.C. was founded in 1896, a full-time manager was not appointed until 1929, when Arthur Graves was appointed upon the club's reformation after a year's hiatus.  Three other managers came and went before the Second World War, after which Charlie Walker took over.  He held the post for two years before being controversially sacked over claims his outside business interests were interfering with his management of the team.

The next manager to last more than one year in the position was Almer Hall, who was appointed in 1950 and held the post for twenty years and led the team to a large number of cup victories, though he was unable to achieve success in league competition. He was replaced in 1970 by former American international Gerry Baker, but his reign lasted only a year. Les Riggs was the next manager and remained in the job for six years but resigned over budget restrictions. Over the following decade, a number of managers came and went in quick succession as the club's financial problems increased.

In the late 1980s and early 1990s former professional players such as Tommy Taylor and Mark Weatherly managed the club with little success, but in 1996, former Dover Athletic manager, Chris Kinnear, took charge and oversaw the club's rise to the Conference National, the highest level of non-league football. The club experienced various off-field problems during this period and had fallen back to the Isthmian League Premier Division by the time Kinnear was dismissed in 2006, with former Gillingham player Robin Trott taking over. He held the job until his dismissal in April 2008.

Managers
All senior competitive first-team matches are included. Statistics correct to 17 September 2008.

References

Managers
 
Margate